The Baie-Comeau Drakkar is a junior ice hockey team in the Quebec Major Junior Hockey League that plays at Centre Henry-Leonard in Baie-Comeau, Quebec, Canada. The name "Drakkar" refers to a type of longship.

History
The Drakkar first played in the QMJHL in 1997–98 season.  One of the founders of the team was former Quebec Nordique co-founder Marius Fortier.

Baie-Comeau has never won the President's Cup, and with just seven winning seasons in their history. The 2012–13 team had the second-best record during the regular season and reached the league finals for the first time in franchise history, but lost to the Halifax Mooseheads, four games to one.

National Hockey League (NHL) alumni include Marc-André Bergeron, Jean-François Jacques, Yanick Lehoux, Olivier Michaud, Joël Perrault, Patrick Thoresen, Bruno St. Jacques and Gabriel Bourque.

During its 2005–06 season, the team was the subject of the documentary film Junior by the National Film Board of Canada.

Coaches
Notable coaches for the Drakkar include Richard Martel, Mario Pouliot and Éric Veilleux.

Season-by-season record
 Baie-Comeau Drakkar (1997–2008)

Regular season
OL = Overtime loss, SL = Shootout loss, Pct = Winning percentage

Playoffs

Team records
The team's all-time leading point scorer is Yanick Lehoux with 164 goals and 218 assists for 382 points; he is also the team's all-time leader in goals and assists. Thierry Douville is the team's all-time penalty minute leader with 1104.  Frédéric Gamelin has played the most games in team history with 315.

Notable players
Marc-André Bergeron (born 1980), Canadian ice hockey player
Jean-François Jacques (born 1985), Canadian ice hockey player
Eliezer Sherbatov (born 1991), Canadian-Israeli ice hockey player

References

External links
Baie-Comeau Drakkar website
Baie-Comeau Drakkar great amateur website

Baie-Comeau
Quebec Major Junior Hockey League teams
Ice hockey teams in Quebec
Ice hockey clubs established in 1997
1997 establishments in Quebec